Temple Beth Shalom, built in 1952, is a synagogue located in the Vedado neighbourhood of downtown Havana. In 1981, much of the original building was sold to the state, and was then turned into the Bertolt Brecht Cultural Center, including a theatre, a music venue, a gallery and a bar. Only part of the structure remains in Jewish hands today. Extensive repairs were undertaken in the 1990s. Beth Shalom is considered the headquarters of the Cuban Jewish Community. The building also houses a Jewish library.

Relationship with the Castro government
Overall, the Jewish community has enjoyed security and antisemitism has been minimal . In the years leading up to his death, Fidel Castro even attended the community's Hanukka celebration .

References

Conservative Judaism in North America
Conservative synagogues
Synagogues in Havana
Ashkenazi synagogues
Ashkenazi Jewish culture in North America
Synagogues completed in 1952
1952 establishments in Cuba
20th-century architecture in Cuba